Baron Milner of Leeds, of Roundhay in the City of Leeds, is a title in the Peerage of the United Kingdom. It was created on 20 December 1951 for the Labour politician James Milner. His only son, the second Baron, was one of the ninety elected hereditary peers that were allowed to remain in the House of Lords after the House of Lords Act of 1999. Like his father Lord Milner of Leeds sat on the Labour benches.  the title is held by the latter's only son, the third Baron, who succeeded in 2003.

Barons Milner of Leeds (1951)
James Milner, 1st Baron Milner of Leeds (1889–1967)
(Arthur James) Michael Milner, 2nd Baron Milner of Leeds (1923–2003)
Richard James Milner, 3rd Baron Milner of Leeds (b. 1959)

There is no heir to the barony.

References

Kidd, Charles, Williamson, David (editors). Debrett's Peerage and Baronetage (1990 edition). New York: St Martin's Press, 1990.

Baronies in the Peerage of the United Kingdom
Noble titles created in 1951
Noble titles created for UK MPs